Mardas is a Greek surname. It is the surname of:
 Magic Alex (1942-2017), born as Alexis Mardas, British-Greek electronics engineer.
 Dimitris Mardas (born 1955), Greek economist and politician.
 Henadz Mardas (1970-2020), Belarusian football coach and player.

See also
 Cham Mardas, a village in Iran.

Greek-language surnames
Surnames